"Chimes at Midnight" is a 1970 Australian TV play by John Croyston which aired on the ABC. It was directed by Eric Tayler. It was the last in a series of TV plays on the ABC called Australian Plays and aired 26 July 1970.

Plot
During World War Two, Chester, an American soldier on leave in Australia meets an Australian girl.

Cast
 Robert Dunlap as Chester
 Pat Bishop
 Don Crosby
 Lynn Murphy
 Lyn Lee

Production

Reception
The Canberra Times said it "was not a bad play, but it could be analysed out of existence. It did have some excellent moments, however."

References

External links
 

1970 television plays
1970s Australian television plays
1970 Australian television episodes
Australian Plays (season 2) episodes